The preliminaries and repechages of the Men's individual kata competition at the 2018 World Karate Championships were held on November 6th, 2018 and the finals on November 10th, 2018.

Results

Finals

Repechage

Pool A
Preliminary round fights

Pool B
Preliminary round fights

Pool C
Preliminary round fights

Pool D
Preliminary round fights

References

External links
Draw

Men's individual kata